The 1978–79 St. John's Redmen basketball team represented St. John's University during the 1978–79 NCAA Division I men's basketball season. The team was coached by Lou Carnesecca in his eleventh year at the school. St. John's home games were (and to this day still are) played at Alumni Hall and Madison Square Garden.

Roster

Schedule and results

|-
!colspan=9 style="background:#FF0000; color:#FFFFFF;"| Regular season

|-
!colspan=9 style="background:#FF0000; color:#FFFFFF;"| ECAC Metro tournament

|-
!colspan=9 style="background:#FF0000; color:#FFFFFF;"| NCAA tournament

Rankings

Team players drafted into the NBA

References

St. John's Red Storm men's basketball seasons
Saint John's
Saint John
Saint John
Saint John